Eric Butorac and Scott Lipsky were the defending champions; however, Colin Fleming and Ken Skupski defeated them 7–6(7–3), 6–4 in the final.

Seeds

Draw

Draw

References
 Main Draw

Aegon Trophy - Doubles
2010 Doubles